Garth Breytenbach (born 14 June 1979), is a South African actor. He is best known for the roles in the films Five Fingers for Marseilles, Beyond the River and Mandela: Long Walk to Freedom.

Personal life
He was born in Cape Town, South Africa. He worked in London, pursuing a career in the hospitality industry. However, he was later moved to acting and film. So he studied and graduated from CityVarsity School of Media Studies, Cape Town. Then he attended to Creative Arts College, to complete a Diploma in Acting for Camera.

Career
His passion for acting came when he attended the theatres in Cape Town and the Grahamstown Arts Festival. Garth made his screen debut in 1993 with the popular South African television serial Generations. In this play, he made a minor role of 'Jacques Venter'. In 2005, he acted in the mini-series, The Triangle directed by Craid R Baxley. Then he made the popular role 'Pvt. Slug Skinner' in 2008 direct-to-video film Starship Troopers 3: Marauder. Since 2014, he appeared in mainstream television acting with Black Sails and later in Deutschland 86 (2018).

In 2017, he starred in the mini-series Madiba and film Beyond The River. However his most popular role in 2017 came through the South African western thriller film Five Fingers For Marseilles with the role 'Officer De Vries'. In 2013, he appeared on the film Long Walk to Freedom opposite Idris Elba. In 2018, he played the role 'Ajax', the Greek warrior in the BBC and Netflix mini-series Troy: Fall Of A City (2018).

He is also famous for his acting in historical dramas such as Mandela: Long Walk to Freedom, Winnie Mandela, Verraaiers and Goodbye Bafana. Apart from dramatic roles, Garth also featured in comedy roles, notably in the series Hammerhead TV, which includes the popular actors Bevan Cullinan, Brendan Jack and Chris Forrest

Partial filmography

See also
 List of Black Sails characters

References

External links
 
 Getting to Know Garth Breytenbach and His Signature Foodie Style

Living people
South African male television actors
1979 births
People from Cape Town
21st-century South African actors
South African male film actors